Peniston Lamb, 1st Viscount Melbourne (29 January 1745 – 22 July 1828), known as Sir Peniston Lamb, 2nd Baronet, from 1768 to 1770, was a British politician who sat in the House of Commons from 1768 to 1793. He was the father of Prime Minister William Lamb, 2nd Viscount Melbourne.

Early life
Lamb was the son of Sir Matthew Lamb, 1st Baronet, and his wife Charlotte (née Coke). He was educated at Eton College from 1755 to 1762 and entered Lincoln's Inn in 1769. He succeeded in the baronetcy on his father's death on 6 November 1768 and inherited Melbourne Hall in Derbyshire. He married Elizabeth Milbanke (1751–1818), daughter of Sir Ralph Milbanke, 5th Baronet, on 13 April 1769. She was a young woman of great beauty, intelligence and strong character, who quickly came to dominate her husband completely, and steered them into the centre of polite society. In 1770 he began, as Melbourne House, what is now The Albany in London.

Political career
At the 1768 general election Lamb was returned unopposed as Member of Parliament for Ludgershall. In 1770 he was raised to the Peerage of Ireland as Lord Melbourne, Baron of Kilmore, in the County of Cavan, but as it was an Irish peerage he was allowed to remain in the House of Commons. He was returned unopposed again as MP for Ludgershall at the elections in 1774 and 1780. In 1781 he was created Viscount Melbourne, of Kilmore in the County of Cavan, also in the Peerage of Ireland. He was appointed Gentleman of the Bedchamber to the Prince of Wales in 1783 and held the position until 1796. At the 1784 general election he stood for Malmesbury and was again returned unopposed. He switched again in 1790 and was returned unopposed at Newport, Isle of Wight. He resigned his seat in 1793 for his son Peniston.

Later life
Lord Melbourne became Lord of the Bedchamber in 1812. In 1815 he was even further honoured when he was made Baron Melbourne, of Melbourne in the County of Derby, in the Peerage of the United Kingdom, which gave him an automatic seat in the House of Lords. He died on 22 July 1828, aged 83 and was succeeded in his titles by his son William.

Family

Melbourne and his wife had seven children.
 
 Hon. Peniston Lamb (3 May 1770 – 24 January 1805)
 Elizabeth Lamb (born 25 October 1777)
 William Lamb (15 March 1779 – 24 November 1848), 2nd Viscount Melbourne
 Frederick James Lamb (17 April 1782 – 29 January 1853), 3rd Viscount Melbourne
 Hon. George Lamb (11 July 1784 – 2 January 1834)
 Emily Lamb, Countess Cowper (1787–1869)
  Harriet Lamb (1789-1803)

Only the first-born son can be definitively attributed to Lord Melbourne due to his wife's many affairs. George is reputed to be the son of George IV, with William and Emily allegedly fathered by Lord Egremont.

Whether Melbourne was made unhappy by his wife's affairs is unclear: he was a mild, easygoing and rather stupid man who avoided trouble, and invariably deferred to his wife, who was by far the stronger and more intelligent partner in the marriage. Their one serious quarrel was caused by the death of their eldest son Pen (who was undoubtedly Melbourne's child); he angrily refused to make the same allowance to William (who was almost certainly not Melbourne's child) as he had given Pen, suggesting that he felt some degree of resentment of his wife's conduct. Lady Melbourne, on her side, tolerated his affair with the courtesan Sophia Baddeley. Nathaniel Wraxall wrote of Melbourne that he was "principally known by the distinguished place that he occupies in the annals of meretricious pleasure, the memoirs of Mrs. Bellamy or Mrs. Baddeley, the sirens and courtesans of a former age".

Melbourne's children regarded him with what has been described as "kindly contempt": his daughter Emily said that he was always going wrong and they were always having to put him right, and that although he was not a heavy drinker, he always seemed drunk.

References

Sources

Kidd, Charles, Williamson, David (editors). Debrett's Peerage and Baronetage (1990 edition). New York: St Martin's Press, 1990, 

|-

1745 births
1828 deaths
People educated at Eton College
Members of Lincoln's Inn
British MPs 1768–1774
British MPs 1774–1780
British MPs 1780–1784
British MPs 1784–1790
British MPs 1790–1796
Members of the Parliament of Great Britain for English constituencies
Viscounts Melbourne
Peers of Ireland created by George III
Peers of the United Kingdom created by George III
Parents of prime ministers of the United Kingdom